Betty Boop's Penthouse is a 1933 Fleischer Studios animated short film featuring Betty Boop assisted by Koko the Clown and Bimbo.

Plot
At Bimbo's Experimental Laboratory, Bimbo and Koko concoct a variety of compounds and elixirs, including a drink that is so hot it turns a black cat into a dragon head, as well as turning the cat into a white and black striped one. Their scientific experiments are interrupted when, through a huge drop of the chemical, they see a bathing-suit-clad Betty taking a shower on the roof of her penthouse.

Distracted by Betty as she sings "Penthouse Serenade," they forget that the chemicals which they have mixed are still on the boil, one of which turns into a Frankenstein-style monster. The creature sees Betty, and crosses over the phone wire to menace her. Although Bimbo and Koko make an effort to stop it from reaching her by cutting the wires using a bird's mouth, the monster defies gravity and reaches the penthouse. Once Betty realizes it's right behind her, she sprays the monster with flower spray, which turns him into a harmless dancing flower. Betty giggles and says, "You're such a nutsy dopesy!"

References

External links
 Betty Boops Penthouse on YouTube
 Betty Boop's Penthouse at the Big Cartoon Database
 Betty Boop's Penthouse at the IMDb

1933 films
Betty Boop cartoons
1930s American animated films
American black-and-white films
1933 animated films
Paramount Pictures short films
Fleischer Studios short films
Short films directed by Dave Fleischer